Clermont Academy is a historic school building located at Clermont in Columbia County, New York.  It was built in 1834 and is a two-story, five bay frame building in the Federal style.  It features a gable roof with centrally located octagonal cupola.  It originally functioned as a private secondary school, but became a public school and community center in 1855.

It was added to the National Register of Historic Places in 1983.  It is located within the Clermont Civic Historic District, established in 2003.

References

School buildings on the National Register of Historic Places in New York (state)
Federal architecture in New York (state)
School buildings completed in 1834
Buildings and structures in Columbia County, New York
Historic district contributing properties in New York (state)
National Register of Historic Places in Columbia County, New York